Shorts are a garment worn over the pelvic area, circling the waist and splitting to cover the upper part of the legs, sometimes extending down to the knees but not covering the entire length of the leg. They are called "shorts" because they are a shortened version of trousers, which cover the entire leg, but not the foot. Shorts are typically worn in warm weather or in an environment where comfort and airflow are more important than the protection of the legs.
 
There are a variety of shorts, ranging from knee-length short trousers that can in some situations be worn as formal clothes to beachwear and athletic shorts. Some types of shorts are typically worn by women, such as culottes, which are a divided skirt resembling a pair of loose-cut shorts.

Terminological differences

The British English term, short trousers, is used, only for shorts that are a short version of ordinary trousers (i.e., pants or slacks in American English). For example: tailored shorts, often lined, as typically worn as part of a school uniform for boys up to their early teens, and by servicemen and policemen in tropical climates. Shorts, used unqualified in British English, refers to sports shorts, athletic shorts, or casual shorts; the last  nowadays commonplace in warm weather in the UK. Shorts are also known as "half pants" in India.

The dated American English term, short pants, is probably the nearest equivalent in the U.S., where they might now be called dress shorts, a term that has not gained much currency in Britain.

A somewhat similar garment worn by men in Australia is called stubbies.

The term, boxer shorts, is an American coinage for a particular kind of men's underwear, and is now also common in Britain. However, boxer shorts are often referred to merely as boxers in the USA. Moreover, whereas the American English usage of the word pants refers to outerwear (i.e., trousers in British English), the usage of pants in British English refers to the garment worn under one's trousers, such as boxers; such a garment, however, is referred to as underpants in American English (note the qualification of the word pants by the word under). Alongside the term
boxer shorts, undershorts or simply shorts were synonyms for underpants during the  time of this coinage; while jockey shorts was a synonym for men's briefs.

Sociology

Europe and America 

In much of Europe and the Americas during the 19th and early 20th centuries, shorts were worn as outerwear only by young boys until they reached a certain height or maturity. When boys got older, typically around puberty, they would receive their first pair of long trousers. This produced the perception that shorts were only for young boys.  Because of this, men would not wear shorts to avoid looking immature, even when the weather is hot. Women tended not to wear shorts in most cultures, due to social mores: they were expected to wear dresses, or skirts and blouses.

In the 1890s, knee pants (an early type of short pants) became the standard wear for American boys. Many urban school portraits from the 1890s show all but the oldest boys wearing knee pants. North American boys normally wore knee pants with short stockings. This began to change after the 1900s when North American boys began wearing knickerbockers during the winter, while short pants became more popular in Europe. In the 1930s, shorts started to be worn for casual comfort (e.g. outdoor and athletic activities) by both men and women. However, it was still taboo to wear shorts outside of certain activities.

Since about the time of World War II, when many soldiers served in tropical locations, adult men have worn shorts more often, especially in summer weather, but the perception of shorts as being only for young boys took several decades to change, and to some extent still exists in certain circles. By the late 20th century it had become more common for men to wear shorts as casual wear in summer, but much less so in cooler seasons.

Worldwide 
Adults are also commonly seen wearing shorts, however wearing shorts is less common among women in traditional eastern countries than in the West, although this varies widely by region - women more often wear shorts in large, cosmopolitan cities. In some countries adult women can be seen wearing loose-fitting shorts that end at or just below the knee, as these are seen as sufficiently modest.

In many countries there are still many settings where wearing shorts would not be acceptable, as they are considered too casual. Notable exceptions where men may wear short trousers to the office or at a formal gathering are South Africa, Bermuda, Australia and New Zealand . Since the 1990s, casual office dress has grown to include formal shorts in some U.K. and U.S. businesses, but by no means universally.

Styles

See also
 Capri pants
 Sleeveless shirt

References

External links 

 
21st-century fashion
History of fashion
Sports culture